Goddard College is a progressive education private liberal arts low-residency college with three locations in the United States: Plainfield, Vermont; Port Townsend, Washington; and Seattle, Washington. The college offers undergraduate and graduate degree programs. With predecessor institutions dating to 1863, Goddard College was founded in 1938 as an experimental and non-traditional educational institution based on the idea of John Dewey that experience and education are intricately linked.

Goddard College uses an intensive low-residency model. First developed for Goddard's MFA in Creative Writing Program, Goddard College operated a mix of residential, low-residency, and distance-learning programs starting in 1963. When it closed its Residential Undergraduate Program in 2002, it switched to a system of 100% low-residency programs. In most of these, each student designs a unique curriculum. The college uses a student self-directed, mentored system in which faculty make narrative evaluations of students' progress as they fulfill their program's degree criteria. Goddard offers a Bachelor of Arts (BA), Bachelor of Fine Arts (BFA), Master of Arts (MA), Master of Fine Arts (MFA), along with several concentrations and Licensures. It enrolls approximately 364 students, 30% of whom are undergraduates. It employs 64 faculty and 50 staff.

The college is accredited by the New England Commission of Higher Education.

History
Goddard College began in 1863 in Barre, Vermont, as the Green Mountain Central Institute. Goddard was a prominent merchant in Boston, and was one of the school's earliest and most generous benefactors.

Founded by Universalists, Goddard Seminary was originally a four-year preparatory high school, primarily affiliated with Tufts College. For many years the Seminary prospered. But the opening of many good public high schools in the 20th century made many of the private New England academies obsolete. To attempt to save it, the trustees added a Junior College to the Seminary in 1935, with a Seminary graduate, Royce S. "Tim" Pitkin, as President.

Royce S. "Tim" Pitkin was a progressive educator and follower of John Dewey, William Heard Kilpatrick and other, similar proponents of educational democracy. In 1936, under his leadership, the Seminary concluded that in order for Goddard to survive, an entirely new institution would need to be created. A number of prominent educators and laymen agreed with him. Pitkin was supported by Stanley C. Wilson, former governor of Vermont and chairman of the Goddard Seminary Board of Trustees; Senators George Aiken and Ralph Flanders, and Dorothy Canfield Fisher.

Pitkin persuaded the Board of Trustees to embrace a new style of education, one that substituted individual attention, democracy, and informality for the traditionally austere and autocratic educational model. On March 13, 1938, Goddard College was chartered. In July 1938 the newly formed Goddard College moved to Greatwood Farm in Plainfield, Vermont.

The new Goddard was an experimental and progressive college. For its first 21 years of operation, Goddard was unaccredited and small, but it built a reputation as one of the most innovative colleges in the country. Especially noteworthy were Goddard's use of discussion as the basic method in classroom teaching; its emphasis on the whole lives of students in determining personal curricula; its incorporation of practical work into the life of every student; and its development of the college as a self-governing learning community in which everyone had a voice.

In 1959 Goddard College was accredited. One of the founding principles of Goddard was that it should provide educational opportunities for adults. There was a great need for a program for adults who had not completed college, to obtain degrees without disrupting their family lives or careers. The Adult Degree Program (ADP), created by Evalyn Bates, was established in 1963. It was the first low-residency adult education program in the country.

Over the years many experimental programs were designed at Goddard. These programs included the Goddard Experimental Program for Further Education, Design Build Program, Goddard Cambridge Program for Social Change, Third World Studies Program, Institute for Social Ecology, Single Parent Program and many others.

Based on its use of narrative transcripts instead of traditional letter grades, as well as learner-designed curricula, Goddard was among the founding members of the Union for Experimenting Colleges and Universities. These included Franconia, Nasson, Antioch, and others.

In 2002, after 54 years, the college terminated its residential undergraduate degree program and became an exclusively low-residency college.  Three years later, the college expanded to the West Coast and established a residency site in Port Townsend, Washington. In July 2011 Goddard began to offer their education program (non-licensure only) in Seattle, Washington.

Goddard was placed on probation in 2018 by the New England Commission of Higher Education because of a perceived "[lack of] stability of executive leadership" and concerns about the college's financial resources. The probation was lifted in 2020 after the college satisfied the commission that it had rectified those issues.

Campuses

Main campus, Greatwood: Plainfield, Vermont
The campus in Plainfield was founded in 1938 on the grounds of a late 19th-century model farm: The Greatwood Farm & Estate consists of shingle-style buildings and gardens designed by Arthur Shurcliff. The Village of Learning, consisting of eleven dormitory buildings, was constructed adjacent to the ensemble of renovated farm buildings in 1963 to accommodate an increasing student population. The Pratt Center & Library, designed to be at the heart of a larger campus, was constructed in 1968.

No other significant new construction has been added to the campus since that time. On March 7, 1996 the Greatwood campus was recognized for its historic and architectural significance by its inclusion on the National Register of Historic Places.

Fort Worden State Park, Port Townsend, Washington campus
A US Army post from 1902 to 1953, much of the fort has been renovated and adapted as a year-round, multi-use facility dedicated to lifelong learning. It houses several organizations that comprise Fort Worden State Park. The fort is located on a bluff overlooking the Strait of Juan de Fuca and Admiralty Inlet near Port Townsend, Washington.

Columbia City, Seattle campus
The MA in Education program, originally held in the Plainfield-based low-residency program, expanded in 2011 into Columbia City, one of Seattle's most ethnically and racially diverse neighborhoods.

The program is unique in that it trains students in bilingual preschool education. Students can focus on such areas as intercultural studies, dual language, early childhood, cultural arts, and community education, and create their plan of studies for each semester. The program is designed to serve students who cannot leave their families and communities for the residency. The “community campus” is housed in different buildings in the area.

Academics
Each Goddard student designs their own curriculum in accordance with their program's degree criteria.

In addition to fulfilling academic criteria in the subjects of the arts, the humanities, mathematics, natural sciences and social sciences, undergraduate students must also demonstrate critical thinking and writing, understanding of social and ecological contexts, positive self-development, and thoughtful action within their learning processes.

The college uses a student self-directed, mentored system in which faculty issue narrative evaluations of student's progress instead of grades. The intensive low-residency model requires that students come to campus every six months for approximately eight days. During this period, students engage in a variety of activities and lectures from early morning until late in the evening, and create detailed study plans. During the semester, students study independently, sending in "packets" to their faculty mentors every few weeks. When low-residency education began at Goddard, packets were made up of paper documents sent via the mail.

Since advances in the internet and related technology, in the 21st century most packets are sent electronically. They may contain artwork, audio files, photography, video and web pages, in addition to writing. The schedule and format of these packets differ from program to program, and content varies with each student-faculty correspondence. The focus is generally on research, writing, and reflection related to each student's individualized study plan.

At regular intervals students compile their work into "learning portfolios" to submit as part of a Progress Review before a cross-program board of faculty. The board ensures that all students' work is in compliance with the college's degree criteria. Undergraduates must complete a yearlong Senior Study, accompanied by final graduating presentations of work, before being awarded a degree.

Facilities

Eliot D. Pratt Center and Library
The Eliot D. Pratt Center and Library, located in Plainfield, Vermont, serves the entire Goddard College community. It is also open to the public. Its holdings contain over 70,000 physical items and access to over 20 electronic databases. The building also houses several administrative offices, an Archives room with artifacts from the 1800s to present, an Art Gallery, and WGDR (91.1 FM), a college/community radio station serving Central Vermont since 1973.

Goddard College Community Radio (WGDR and WGDH)
Goddard is home to Goddard College Community Radio, a community-based, non-commercial, listener-supported educational radio station. It has nearly 70 volunteer programmers who live and work in central and northern Vermont and who range in age from 12 to 78 years. WGDR, 91.1 FM, is licensed to Plainfield, Vermont. Its sister station, WGDH, 91.7 FM, is licensed to Hardwick, Vermont. Goddard College Community Radio is the largest non-commercial community radio station in Vermont; it is the only non-commercial station in the state other than the statewide Vermont Public Radio network, which receives funding from the Corporation for Public Broadcasting.

Haybarn Theatre
This structure was originally built as a barn in 1868 by the Martin Family and was one of the largest barns in Central Vermont. The Haybarn was originally used to store hay, grain and livestock. In 1938, when Goddard College purchased Greatwood Farm, they began the process of adapting the farm buildings into academic and student spaces. The Haybarn was renovated to provide a space for the performing arts.

For almost 75 years the Haybarn Theatre has been a place where the local community and the College come together to enjoy and appreciate the arts. The Haybarn hosts educational conferences, student and community performances, and the ongoing Goddard College Concert Series.

Notable events

Alternative Media Conference
In June 1970 Goddard hosted the Alternative Media Conference; it attracted more than 1,600 radio DJs and others involved in independent media from all over the United States. Featured presenters included Yippie founder Jerry Rubin, spiritual leader Ram Dass, Larry Yurdin, and Danny Fields, Bob Fass and Paul Krassner from The Realist.

A music roster of up-and-coming bands was curated by Atlantic Records and included Dr. John and the J. Geils Band. The conference embodied both the political activism and the free-love atmosphere of the time: a coalition affiliated with the Panther 21, The Guardian, Newsreel, Radio Free People, Liberation News Service, Media Women, and The New York Rat put together a packet highlighting the political side of alternative media.

A second Alternative Media Conference was held on campus in 2013 to commemorate the college's 150th anniversary. Thom Hartmann and Ellen Ratner were featured speakers.

2014 undergraduate commencement
In 2014, the graduating class of the college's undergraduate program selected convicted murderer and Goddard alumnus Mumia Abu-Jamal as commencement speaker. Abu-Jamal, who had attended Goddard as an undergraduate in the 1970s, completed his Goddard degree from prison via mail while serving a sentence for the 1982 murder of Philadelphia police officer Daniel Faulkner. Faulkner's widow criticized the selection of Abu-Jamal as a speaker, as did US Senator Pat Toomey, the Vermont Troopers Association, the Vermont Police Chiefs Association, the Fraternal Order of Police, and the Pennsylvania Department of Corrections.  The college's interim President, Bob Kenny, supported the right of students to select a commencement speaker of their choice.

On October 5, the school released Abu-Jamal's pre-recorded commencement speech. Philadelphia police protested against his being given a chance to speak.

Notable people associated with the college

Alumni

 Alan Briskin – organizational consultant
 Ann Gillespie – actor (Beverly Hills, 90210)
 Anna Lee Walters — author
 Archie Shepp – saxophonist
 Blakeley White-McGuire – Principal dancer of Martha Graham Dance Company
 Bradford Graves – sculptor, musician, professor (fine arts, sculpture)
 Cara Hoffman – novelist
 Caroline Finkelstein – poet
 Charlie Bondhus – poet
 Chris Spirou — politician
 Christopher Dell - historian, author, literary critic, and employee at the Library of Congress
 Conrad Herwig – jazz trombonist
 Daniel Boyarin – professor of Jewish Studies
 David Gallaher – graphic novelist
 David Helvarg – journalist and environmental activist
 David Mamet – writer, director, Pulitzer prize winner in drama (Glengarry Glen Ross)
 Deborah Tall — poet
 Donald Kofi Tucker – politician
 Ed Allen – American short story writer
 Elaine Terranova – poet
 Ellen Bryant Voigt – MacArthur Genius, former State Poet of Vermont
 Ellen Ratner — White House correspondent
 Ellis Avery – novelist and poet
 Esther Wertheimer – sculptor
 Evalyn Bates – progressive educator, developed the first low-residency American adult degree program
 Frances Olsen – professor of law at UCLA
 Geraldine Clinton Little – poet
 Helen Landgarten – art therapy pioneer
 Howard Ashman – actor, playwright (Little Shop of Horrors), lyricist (The Little Mermaid, Beauty and the Beast)
 J. Ward Carver – Vermont Attorney General, 1925–1931
 Jacqueline Berger — poet
 James Gahagan – abstract artist
 Jane O'Meara Sanders – former president of Burlington College, wife of Senator Bernie Sanders
 Jane Shore – poet
 Jared Carter – poet
 Jared Pappas-Kelley – curator, writer, and artist
 Jay Craven – Vermont film director, screenwriter, and professor
 Jeff McCracken — film and television actor, director, writer, and producer
 Jennifer McMahon — novelist
 Jerri Allyn — performance artist
 John Kasiewicz – guitarist
 Jon Fishman – rock band member (Phish)
 Jonathan Katz – comedian, writer, actor, producer (Dr. Katz)
 Judith Arcana — writer
 Karen Essex — author, journalist, screenwriter
 Kenneth R. Timmerman – correspondent, author, activist
 Kiara Brinkman — author
 Kris Neely – artist and educator
 Larry Feign – cartoonist (The World of Lily Wong)
 Laura McCullough – poet and writer
 Linda McCarriston – poet and professor
 Linnea Johnson – poet
 Lisa Brooks – historian of New England's Native American history
 Lucia Capacchione — art therapist
 Madeline Stone — songwriter
 Mark Doty – poet, National Book Award winner, 2008
 Martin Hyatt — author
 Mary Johnson – author and director of A Room of Her Own Foundation
 Mary Karr – author
 Matthew Quick – American author of young adult and fiction novels
 Mayme Agnew Clayton – librarian, and the founder of the Western States Black Research and Education Center
 Michael Lent – visual artist and curator
 Miriam Hopkins — film and television actor
 Monica Mayer – Mexican artist
 Mumia Abu Jamal – journalist, former Black Panther Party member, convict, author
 Neil Landau – (former faculty) screenwriter, playwright, television producer
 Norman Dubie – poet
 Oliver Foot – British actor, philanthropist, charity worker
 Page McConnell – rock band member (Phish)
 Pamela Stewart – poet
 Paul Zaloom – puppeteer, host of television show Beakman's World
 Peter Hannan – artist, writer, producer (CatDog)
 Philip Zuchman – American painter
 Piers Anthony – English American author
 Robert Louthan — poet
 Robert M. Fisher – abstract artist
 Ronnie Burrage — jazz percussionist
 Roo Borson —poet
 Russell Potter – Arctic historian, author
 Stephen C. Smith – economist, professor, author
 Sue Owen — poet
 Susan Tichy — poet
 Susie Ibarra – contemporary composer and percussionist
 Suzi Wizowaty – author and politician
 Taina Asili — musician
 Tim Costello (1945–2009), labor and anti-globalization advocate and author
 Tobias Schneebaum – artist, anthropologist, AIDS activist
 Tom Griffin – playwright of The Boys Next Door
 Tommie Smith – athlete, activist, educator, gold medal winner at the 1968 Summer Olympics who set seven individual world records
 Tony Curtis (Welsh poet) (born 1946) – Welsh poet and author
 Trey Anastasio – guitarist, singer, songwriter, member of the band Phish
 Walter F. Scott – (Goddard Seminary) Vermont State Treasurer
 Walter Klenhard — film director, writer and actor
 Walter Mosley – author
 Wayne Karlin – author
 William H. Macy – actor
 William L. White – addiction studies
 William Wildman Campbell — United States House of Representatives
 Yadira Guevara-Prip — stage and television actor.

Faculty, staff and administration

 Arisa White – current faculty advisor in the BFA Creative Writing Program
 Caryn Mirriam-Goldberg – American writer and third Kansas Poet Laureate who founded Goddard's Transformative Language Arts program
 David Mamet – American playwright, essayist, screenwriter, and film director
 Donald Hall — poet and literary critic
 Ellen Bryant Voigt — helped found Goddard's first low-residency program before starting a similar program at Warren Wilson College
 Ernie Stires — composer
 Frank Conroy — author
 Geoffrey Wolff — author
 Hameed Sharif “Herukhuti” Williams – African-American sociologist, cultural studies scholar, sex educator, playwright/poet, and award-winning author
 Heather McHugh — poet
 James Gahagan — sculptor, chairman of Goddard's art department from 1971–79
 Jane O'Meara Sanders – served one year as interim president of Goddard
 John Irving — author
 John Froines – one of the Chicago Seven, taught chemistry in the early 1970s
 Lisel Mueller – poet
 Louise Gluck — Nobel Laureate, poet, winner of the National Book Award and Pulitzer Prize for Poetry
 Marilyn Salzman Webb — activist and journalist who founded Goddard's women's studies program
 Marvin Bell — first Poet Laureate of the State of Iowa
 Michael Ryan — poet
 Murray Bookchin (1921–2006) – American anarchist author, orator, and philosopher
 Peter Schumann and his Bread and Puppet Theater were the theatre-in-residence at Goddard College from 1970–1974
 Raymond Carver — author
 Richard Ford — author
 Robert Hass — poet
 Stephen Dobyns — poet and novelist
 Thomas Yamamoto – art instructor
 Tobias Wolff — author
 Walter Butts – American poet and the Poet Laureate of New Hampshire.

See also
 List of colleges and universities in the United States

References

External links

 

 
1863 establishments in Vermont
Alternative education
Buildings and structures in Plainfield, Vermont
Education in Washington County, Vermont
Educational institutions established in 1863
Historic districts on the National Register of Historic Places in Vermont
National Register of Historic Places in Washington County, Vermont
Private universities and colleges in Vermont
Progressive colleges
Tourist attractions in Washington County, Vermont